Jahrmarkt is the German name of:
Balassagyarmat, Hungary
Giarmata, Romania